The 1968–69 FC Bayern Munich season was the club's fourth season in Bundesliga.

Review and events
Bayern won the championship of the Bundesliga. They also won the cup, defeating Schalke 04 2–1 in the final.

Match results

Legend

Bundesliga

League fixtures and results

League standings

DFB-Pokal

References

FC Bayern Munich seasons
Bayern
German football championship-winning seasons